Glenn Ralph Jonas (born 13 August 1970) is a former New Zealand cricketer who played for the Otago Volts and the Wellington Firebirds in State Shield and State Championship. He also played for Hutt Valley and Dunedin Metropolitan in the Hawke Cup. He was born in Carterton.

See also
 List of Otago representative cricketers

References
Cricinfo: Glenn Jonas

1970 births
Living people
New Zealand cricketers
Otago cricketers
Wellington cricketers
People from Carterton, New Zealand